Marcelo de Azcárraga Ugarte y Palmero-Versosa de Lizárraga (4 September 1832 – 30 May 1915) was a Spanish soldier-politician and thirteenth Prime Minister of Spain following the restoration of the Spanish monarchy. He served as Prime Minister in 1897, 1900–1901, and 1904–1905. Azcárraga was the only Spanish Prime Minister of part Insulares, specifically Spanish Filipino, descent.

Early life
Azcárraga was born in 1832, in Manila in the Spanish East Indies, to General José de Azcárraga y Ugarte, a native of Vizcaya, Spain, a bookshop owner in Escolta, Manila, and to María Palmero Versosa, a Mestiza from Albay.

Education
General José Azcárraga had many sons and daughters. Azcárraga was the second of the family's children. He studied law in the Royal University of Santo Tomas in Manila then entered the Nautical School or Escuela Náutica de Manila (today, the Philippine Merchant Marine Academy) where he was awarded the first prize in mathematics.

Military service
He was sent to Spain by his father to enter the military academy and soon earned the rank of captain in three years. Due to his services against the O'Donnell revolution in Spain, he was promoted to major.

Military awards
At the age of 23, he was awarded Spain's highest military award for gallantry the Cross of San Fernando, which is a pension grant.

Colonial service
He was sent to various colonies of Spain, including New Spain, the Captaincy General of Cuba, and the Captaincy General of Santo Domingo.

Marriage
Afterward, he returned to Cuba and married one of the daughters of the wealthy Fesser family, owner and founder of Banco y Casa de Seguros Fesser, one of the biggest banks of Cuba, who allegedly gave him £20,000 on the day of his marriage. He was the husband of Margarita Fesser y Diago, a daughter of Edward also known as Don Eduardo Fesser y Kirchnair of the United States and Micaela Diago y Tato of Havana. They owned the Almacenes de Regla (Regla Warehouse) and Banco de Comercio and all the rail lines between Regla and Matanzas, then known as the Ferrocaril de la Bahia de la Habana. Almacenes de Regla, founded in 1843 with initial capital of 150,000 Cuban pesos, was so large that it stored half of all of Cuba's sugar production, and by 1853, had increased its original capital tenfold.

His children were Carlos Azcarraga y Fesser; Margarita de Azcárraga y Fesser de Trenor Palavicino, the first Marquise of Turia; María Azcárraga y Fesser; the Spanish politician and military statesman José María Azcarraga y Fesser and Carmen Azcarraga y Fesser. His direct descendant includes Don Tomas Trenor Puig of Valencia and Madrid, the fourth Marquis of Turia.

Years as Prime Minister
In 1868, on the deposal of Queen Isabella II, he returned to Spain, hastened the restoration of the Bourbons, and became Lieutenant-General on the coronation of Alfonso XII as king. He was then elected to the Senate of Spain as a senator for life. He was the Minister of War under Antonio Cánovas del Castillo, whose assassination on 8 August 1897 effectively made him the interim Prime Minister of Spain until 4 October of that same year.

He went on to become Prime Minister of Spain twice again in two more separate incidents.

Retirement
On his retirement at the age of 72, he was given the Toison de Oro, or Order of the Golden Fleece, the highest possible distinction given to a person in Spain, for his tirelessly defending the Spanish Monarchy and for keeping Spain in relative peace. Earlier, he received the Cross of San Fernando which already entitled him to a pension. Don Marcelo Azcárraga died in Madrid.

Family and Ancestry

On his mother's side, Azcárraga descends from the Spanish Filipino Lizarraga family, heirs of the fallen Conde de Lizarraga. His maternal uncles' families, collectively known as the "Palmero brothers" or "Hermanos Palmero" were active in Philippine politics before World War II. He was also an uncle to the self-styled Conde de Albay, also known as Señor Pedro Govantes. His brother Manuel was a scholar who wrote a book on the Philippine economy.

Tribute 
The major road stretching from the districts of Tondo to San Miguel, both in the city of Manila was named after Azcárraga. However, it was changed after Filipino independence in 1945 to Claro M. Recto Avenue, after politician Claro M. Recto. A few of the older Manila residents still call this road "Calle Azcárraga" or "Paseo de Azcárraga".

See also
 Spanish East Indies
 Spanish Filipino
 Philippine Spanish
 Chavacano
 Captaincy General of the Philippines
 Intramuros Grand Marian Procession
 Gates of Intramuros
 Fort Santiago

References

See also

 Palmero Conspiracy

1832 births
1915 deaths
Conservative Party (Spain) politicians
People from Manila
People from Intramuros
Prime Ministers of Spain
Spanish captain generals
Spanish people of Filipino descent
University of Santo Tomas alumni
19th-century Spanish military personnel
19th-century Spanish people
Presidents of the Senate of Spain
Spanish people of Basque descent